Paweł Midloch is a Polish sprint canoer who competed in the late 1990s. He won a bronze medal in the C-4 1000 m event at the 1997 ICF Canoe Sprint World Championships in Dartmouth.

References

Living people
Polish male canoeists
Year of birth missing (living people)
Place of birth missing (living people)
ICF Canoe Sprint World Championships medalists in Canadian